Amrit Lubana (born 22 April 1997) is an Indian cricketer. He made his Twenty20 debut on 13 January 2021, for Chandigarh in the 2020–21 Syed Mushtaq Ali Trophy. He made his List A debut on 9 December 2021, for Chandigarh in the 2021–22 Vijay Hazare Trophy. He made his first-class debut on 24 February 2022, for Chandigarh in the 2021–22 Ranji Trophy.

References

External links
 

1997 births
Living people
Indian cricketers
Chandigarh cricketers
Place of birth missing (living people)